The Brazilian National Road Race Championships have been held since 2000.

Men

U23

Women

See also
Brazilian National Time Trial Championships
National Road Cycling Championships

References

National road cycling championships
Cycle races in Brazil
Recurring sporting events established in 2000
2000 establishments in Brazil
Cycling